Hunting High and Low may refer to:

"Hunting High and Low" (A-ha album), 1985
"Hunting High and Low" (A-ha song), 1986
"Hunting High and Low", a song by Stratovarius from Infinite, 2000
"Hunting High and Low", a song by Freedom Call from The Circle of Life, 2005